The 36th Guangdong-Hong Kong Cup will be held on 29 December 2013 and 1 January 2014. The first leg will be played at Mong Kok Stadium with the second leg to take place at Huizhou Olympic Stadium.

Squads

Guangdong
 Head coach:  Ou Chuliang
 Assistant coach:  Feng Feng,  Tian Ye

Hong Kong
 Head coach:  Kim Pan-Gon

Match details

First leg

MATCH OFFICIALS
Assistant referees:
Chan Shui Hung (Hong Kong)
Lam Chi Ho (Hong Kong)
Fourth official: 
Tong Kui Sum (Hong Kong)

MATCH RULES
90 minutes. (1st Half Added Time:  mins, 2nd Half Added Time:  mins)
Unlimited named substitutes
Maximum of 6 substitutions.

Second leg

MATCH OFFICIALS
Assistant referees:
Liang Songshang (China PR)
Xie Weijian (China PR)
Fourth official: Zhan Jiajun (China PR)

MATCH RULES
90 minutes. (1st Half Added Time:  mins, 2nd Half Added Time:  mins)
30 minutes of extra-time if necessary.
Penalty shoot-out if scores still level.
Unlimited named substitutes
Maximum of 5 substitutions.

References

2013–14 in Hong Kong football
2014
2014 in Chinese football